The Great Debate is a VH1 television program in the US which debates pop culture. It was premiered on July 6, 2009, and is introduced by the boxing ring announcer Michael Buffer.

Commentators
Michael Buffer
Regan Burns
Bil Dwyer
B.D. Freeman
Gilbert Gottfried
Hulk Hogan
Joselyn Hughes
Randy Jones
Carrie Keegan
Darryl McDaniels
Shanna Moakler
Modern Humorist (Michael Colton and John Aboud)
Omarasa Manigault Newman
Rachel Quaintance
Ray J
Salt-n-Pepa
Sir Mix-a-Lot
Jerry Springer
Tila Tequila
Brian Unger
Elon James White
Chris Williams
Chris Wylde

Topics
 Worst Thing to Happen to a Penis on Film: There's Something About Mary vs. Porky's
 Most Effective PSA: Crying Indian vs. Your Brain on Drugs
 Best Teen Soap: 90210 vs. The O.C.
 Dreamiest Travolta Stud: Tony Manero vs. Danny Zuko
 Kanye West: Musical Genius or Tool
 Hotter Russian Tennis Babe: Maria Sharapova vs. Anna Kournikova
 Which is the Better Hulk: Hulk Hogan vs. The Incredible Hulk
 Most Hated Reality Show Villain: Omarosa vs. Spencer Pratt
 Which Was the Wildest Toy Craze: Cabbage Patch Kids vs. Tickle Me Elmo
 Who is the Bigger Attention Whore: Criss Angel vs. David Blaine
 Ultimate '80s Teen Villain: James Spader vs. Billy Zabka
 Most Memorable Commercial Featuring a Cat: Morris vs. Meow Mix
 Sadder Song: "Nothing Compares 2 U" vs "Tears in Heaven"
 Primo '80s Teen Queen: Debbie Gibson vs. Tiffany
 Who's Your Maple Syrup Mama: Mrs. Butterworth vs. Aunt Jemima
 Social Networking: Twitter vs. Facebook
 Best Talent Show Ever: Star Search vs. American Idol
 Hotter Simpson Sister: Ashlee Simpson vs. Jessica Simpson
 Mightier Kick-Ass TV Car: The General Lee vs. KITT
 Which Was the Better Dance Craze: "Y.M.C.A." vs. "Macarena"
 Ultimate All-Girl Pop Group: Spice Girls vs. Pussycat Dolls
 Which Invention Helped Men More: Rogaine vs. Viagra
 Most Believable Man in Drag: Mrs. Doubtfire vs. Tootsie
 Which Sex Tape Had the Bigger Impact: Paris Hilton vs. Kim Kardashian
 Which Sports Anthem Pumps You Up More: "Rock and Roll, Part 2" vs. "We Will Rock You"
 Perez Hilton: Love Him or Hate Him
 More Controversial Rapper: Eminem vs. Snoop Dogg
 The Snuggie: Genius or Crap
 Who Wins in a Fight: He-Man vs. ThunderCats
 Bigger Book Craze: The Da Vinci Code vs. Harry Potter
 Most Entertaining Pageant: Westminster Dog Show vs. Miss America
 Better Talk Show Host: Conan vs. Letterman
 Huger Schwarzenegger Bad-Ass: Conan the Barbarian vs. The Terminator
 Who's More Bootylicious: Beyonce vs. J.Lo
 Jerkiest High School Principal: Rooney vs. Vernon
 Who's Got More Cooties: Pete Doherty vs. Amy Winehouse
 Steamier Bisexual Fantasy: Lindsay Lohan vs. Tila Tequila
 Ultimate Primetime Game Show: Wheel of Fortune vs. Jeopardy!
 Who Stole the Show: Urkel vs. The Fonz
 Spicier Sexpert: Dr. Ruth vs. Sue Johansen
 Weepiest Tearjerker: Terms of Endearment vs. Steel Magnolias
 Who is the Flashier Showboat: Sanders vs. Owens
 Who is the Better Royal Lay: Prince Harry vs. Prince Charles
 Best TV Housekeeper: Mrs. Garrett vs. Alice
 Most Bad-Ass Tarantino Flick: Reservoir Dogs vs. Pulp Fiction
 Hottest Gilligan Castaway: Mary Ann vs. Ginger
 Most Legendary Hollywood Couple: Kermit and Miss Piggy vs. Bogart and Bacall
 Brüno vs. Borat
 Guiltier Reality TV Pleasure: Rock of Love vs. Flavor of Love
 Ultimate Female Movie Psycho: Glenn Close vs. Kathy Bates
 Who Has the Most Fabulous Reality Show: Tyra Banks vs. Heidi Klum
 Which Are Cuter: Kittens vs. Puppies
 The Hills: Genius or Dumb
 Who's the Bigger Political Cad: John Edwards vs. Bill Clinton
 Does Disco Suck: Yes or No
 Coolest TV Cop Pair: CHiPs vs. Miami Vice
 Most Memorable Commercial Featuring an Old Lady: "Where's the Beef?" vs. "I've Fallen and I Can't Get Up!"
 Hotter Charlie's Angels Trio: The 2000s vs. The '70s
 Boxers vs. Briefs
 Battle of the '80s Charity Songs: "We Are the World" vs. "Do They Know It's Christmas?"
 Ugliest Sports Injury Ever: Holyfield vs. Theismann
 Raddest Video Game Craze: Pac-Man vs. Donkey Kong
 Who Would You Rather Adopt: Arnold vs. Webster
 Lady Gaga vs. Katy Perry
 Who's Tougher: Rambo vs. Rocky
 Best Boy Band: NSYNC vs. New Kids on the Block
 The Jerry Springer Show: Trash or Gold
 Super Harrison Ford Hero: Han Solo vs. Indiana Jones
 Top Pop Princess: Britney vs. Christina
 Scariest Serial Killer: Freddy vs. Jason
 Boobs: Fake vs. Real
 Mega Music Mogul: Diddy vs. Jay-Z
 Geekiest Fans: Star Wars vs. Star Trek
 Team Aniston vs. Team Jolie
 Bigger Blockbuster Craze: Jurassic Park vs. Titanic
 Greatest Band of All Time: Beatles vs. Rolling Stones
 Supreme Diva: Whitney vs. Mariah
 Which Alien Would You Rather Party With: ALF vs. E.T.
 The Simpsons vs. Family Guy
 Best Pop Star Ever: Madonna vs. Michael Jackson
 Fiercest Supermodel Biatch: Naomi Campbell vs. Janice Dickinson
 Which Baseball Franchise Rules: Red Sox vs. Yankees
 Sexiest 'Stache: Burt Reynolds vs. Tom Selleck
 Worst Celebrity Excuse: Simpson's Acid Reflux vs. Piven's Mercury Poisoning
 Biggest Fall from Grace: George Michael vs. Boy George
 Greatest Cheestastic Broadway Show on Earth: Cats vs. Phantom
 Who Cares More About the World: Sting vs. Bono
 Least Arousing Sex Book: The Joy of Sex vs. Madonna's Sex
 Would You Rather Be a Flintstone or a Jetson
 Most Indestructible Rocker: Ozzy Osbourne vs. Keith Richards
 Most Hideous Footwear Trend: Crocs vs. Uggs
 Funniest TV Foreigner: Balki vs. Latka
 Better Buzz: Red Bull vs. Jolt
 Which Member of The View Would You Eat First If Stranded on a Desert Island
 Best Cartoon Pet: Snoopy vs. Garfield
 Best Jersey Export: Bruce Springsteen vs. Bon Jovi

External links
 

2009 American television series debuts
2009 American television series endings
VH1 original programming